Sarah Bonar (born 9 February 1994 Aberdeen) is a Scottish international rugby union player. She plays as a lock. She has 33 caps for the Scotland women's national rugby union team.

Biography 
She graduated from Loughborough University.

In September 2022, she competed at the 2021 Rugby World Cup, in New Zealand.

She competed at the 2017 Women's Six Nations Championship, 2020 Women's Six Nations Championship, and 2022 Women's Six Nations Championship.

At the club level, she plays at Harlequins. 

She serves in the Royal Air Force. She teaches geography.

References 

1994 births
Living people
Scottish female rugby union players
Scotland women's international rugby union players
Alumni of Loughborough University